Marion County is a county located in the northeastern portion of Missouri. As of the 2010 census, the population was 28,781. Its county seat is Palmyra.  Unique from most third-class counties in the state, Marion has two county courthouses, the second located in Hannibal. The county was organized on December 23, 1826 and named for General Francis Marion, the "Swamp Fox," who was from South Carolina and served in the American Revolutionary War. The area was known as the "Two Rivers Country" before organization.

Marion County is part of the Hannibal, Missouri Micropolitan Statistical Area, which is included in the Quincy-Hannibal, IL-MO Combined Statistical Area.

Geography

Adjacent counties
Lewis County (north)
Adams County, Illinois (northeast)
Pike County, Illinois (southeast)
Ralls County (south)
Monroe County (southwest)
Shelby County (west)

Major Roadways
 I-72
 US-24
 US-36
 US-61
 Route 6
 Route 168
 Great River Road
 Hannibal Expressway (proposed)

History
Marion County was created by the state legislature in 1845 from parts of Ralls and Shelby Counties. It was settled from Virginia and Kentucky by farmers looking for cheap farmland; some owned slaves. It was named after Francis Marion, a general in the Revolutionary War. The county seat is Palmyra, which was established in 1833 and became a locally important river port on the Mississippi. By the late 1800s, the county was the center of a thriving agricultural community. Tobacco was the main crop, though cotton, wheat, barley, oats, and hay were also grown. Livestock included horses, mules, and cattle.
 
The best known native son is Mark Twain (Samuel Langhorne Clemens) born in 1835, in the village of Florida. His youthful experiences in Hannibal became the setting for the adventures of Tom Sawyer and Huckleberry Finn. Other prominent locals included Governor John S. Phelps, and Confederate General A.P. Morehead. The region was bitterly divided in the Civil War but Unionist elements prevailed.  Palmyra was the site of a skirmish in 1862, and the county was the site of several other battles and raids. Today, Marion County continues to be primarily an agricultural county. It is home to a number of historic sites and buildings, with a major tourist industry focused on Mark Twain characters and settings.

Demographics

As of the census of 2010, there were 28,781 people, 11,066 households, and 7,524 families residing in the county. The population density was 65 people per square mile (25/km2). There were 12,443 housing units at an average density of 28 per square mile (11/km2). The racial makeup of the county was 93.26% White, 4.62% Black or African American, 0.27% Native American, 0.28% Asian, 0.08% Pacific Islander, 0.18% from other races, and 1.32% from two or more races. Approximately 0.89% of the population were Hispanic or Latino of any race. 28.5% were German, 25.6% American, 11.0% Irish, and 10.3% English ancestry.

There were 11,066 households, out of which 33.30% had children under the age of 18 living with them, 53.50% were married couples living together, 11.40% had a female householder with no husband present, and 32.00% were non-families. 28.10% of all households were made up of individuals, and 13.80% had someone living alone who was 65 years of age or older. The average household size was 2.44, and the average family size was 2.98.

In the county, the population was spread out, with 25.70% under the age of 18, 9.50% from 18 to 24, 26.40% from 25 to 44, 21.70% from 45 to 64, and 16.60% who were 65 years of age or older. The median age was 37 years. For every 100 females, there were 89.40 males. For every 100 females age 18 and over, there were 85.70 males.

The median income for a household in the county was $31,774, and the median income for a family was $41,290. Males had a median income of $30,935 versus $20,591 for females. The per capita income for the county was $16,964.  About 9.30% of families and 12.10% of the population were below the poverty line, including 15.30% of those under age 18 and 10.50% of those age 65 or over.

2020 Census

Education

Public schools
Hannibal Public School District No. 60 – Hannibal
Veterans Elementary School (K-05) 
A.D. Stowell Elementary School (K-05) 
Mark Twain Elementary School (K-05) 
Oakwood Elementary School (K-05) 
Eugene Field Elementary School (K-05) 
Early Childhood Center (PK)
Hannibal Middle School (06-08) 
Hannibal High School (09-12) 
Palmyra R-I School District – Palmyra
Palmyra Elementary School (K-04) 
Palmyra Middle School (05-08) 
Palmyra High School (09-12)
Marion County R-II School District – Philadelphia
Marion County Elementary School (K-06) 
Marion County High School (07-12)

Private schools
Holy Family Catholic School – Hannibal (K-09) – Roman Catholic 
St. John’s Lutheran School – Hannibal (K-06) – Lutheran

Post-secondary
Hannibal–LaGrange University – Hannibal – A private, four-year Southern Baptist university.

Public libraries
Hannibal Free Public Library  
Palmyra Bicentennial Public Library

Politics

State

Marion County is in Missouri's 5th district in the Missouri House of Representatives, represented by Lindell F. Shumake (R-Hannibal).

All of Marion County is a part of Missouri's 18th District in the Missouri Senate; it is represented by Brian Munzlinger (R-Williamstown).

Federal

Marion County is included in Missouri's 6th Congressional District and is represented by Sam Graves (R-Tarkio) in the U.S. House of Representatives.

Historically a Democratic county in the 20th century, with the exception of Republican landslides in 1972 and 1984, Marion County has been reliably Republican since 2000. The last Democrat to receive 40% or more of the vote was Al Gore that same year.

Missouri presidential preference primary (2008)

Former U.S. Senator Hillary Clinton (D-New York) received more votes, a total of 1,587, than any candidate from either party in Marion County during the 2008 presidential primary.

Communities

Cities and towns

Hannibal
Monroe City (mostly in Monroe County and a small part in Ralls County)
Palmyra (county seat)

Unincorporated communities

 Barkley
 Bellville
 Benbow
 Cave City
 Ely
 Emerson
 Heather
 Helton
 Hester
 Little Union
 Mungers
 Naomi
 Nelsonville
 Newmarket
 North River
 Philadelphia
 Sharpsburg
 Smileyville
 Taylor
 Uva
 Warren
 West Ely
 West Quincy
 White Bear
 Withers Mill
 Woodland

Former communities

 Cherry Dell
 Lamb
 Mark

See also
National Register of Historic Places listings in Marion County, Missouri

References

Further reading
 History of Marion County, Missouri: written and compiled from the most authentic official and private sources (1884) full text

External links
 Digitized 1930 Plat Book of Marion County  from University of Missouri Division of Special Collections, Archives, and Rare Books

 
1826 establishments in Missouri
Populated places established in 1826
Hannibal, Missouri micropolitan area
Missouri counties on the Mississippi River